Mahesh Bhupathi and Jonas Björkman were the defending champions.  Bhupathi did not participate this year.  Björkman partnered Joachim Johansson.

Björkman and Johansson won in the final 6–2, 6–3, against José Acasuso and Sebastián Prieto.

Seeds

Draw

Draw

External links
Draw

Swedish Open
2005 ATP Tour
Swedish